Ode to Sunshine is an album by American rock band Delta Spirit, released August 26, 2008, on Rounder Records. It is the band's debut album, following their 2006 EP I Think I've Found It.

Reception

AllMusics Hal Horowitz wrote, "The ex-Noise Ratchet founders shift to more rootsy territory with their new band, yielding impressive results", and that "Ode to Sunshine was recorded in a cabin in Julian, CA, and those surroundings seem to have brought a raw, rootsy, almost Basement Tapes-styled feel to the stripped-down songs and production." The A.V. Clubs Chris Martins said the album "is brimming with gritty, staggering soul that floods the gap between the Stones' R&B-inflected; early oeuvre and Cold War Kids' world-weary keening. That said, Ode is impressively measured, and neither the rollicking shambolics of "Trashcan" nor the slow, whiskey-seeping grind of "Parade" would be half as effective without a certain tautness."

NMEs Tessa Harris said the band's "sound is timeworn and instantly familiar: the "set me free" chorus of 'Streetwalker' is pure Springsteen, while the honky-tonk of 'Trashcan' is classic Stones, made more remarkable by the sandpaper snarl of their frontman." PopMatters Andrew Martin wrote that "Every year there is one album that comes out of nowhere, kicks you in the ass, and demands your attention. It finds itself on your iPod, inside your CD player, and blaring out of your headphones or speakers. Then, you commit to spreading the word about the album to anyone and everyone. Because, just like how misery loves company, so does a music lover who has just discovered a fantastic new album. For me, and others I am sure, Delta Spirit's Ode to Sunshine is just that album." Prefix Magazine said "it would be easy to christen the Delta Spirit's sonically referential sound as the Violent Femmes gone sepia. Many already have", and "Despite Delta Spirit's anarchic (i.e., creatively opportunistic) sampling of everything from cold war folk to the Cold War Kids, when the band members hit their stride — as on the rumbling, locomotive grooves of piano-stung epic Americana on "Trashcan" — Sunshine becomes nothing less than an ode to musical joy."

Slants Nate Adams wrote that "The songs on Sunshine range from vaguely spiritual (the groove-heavy first single "Trashcan") to openly Christian (the passable but forgettable "Children"), and while this is by no means a bad thing, it can be distracting at times: No one likes to be preached at, even if the message is wrapped up inside bluesy pop songs", and that "Sadly, the guitars are buried low in the mix, forcing the vocals and piano to do most of the work." Spins Nate Adams said "Whether it's a happy accident or a painstaking work of art, the rousing debut of this San Diego quintet impresses mightily. Despite passing echoes of Spoon and Violent Femmes, Delta Spirit's rough barroom pop is its own creature, with jangly pianos, rattling drums, and scruffy acoustic guitars making a thrilling ruckus."

Track listing

Personnel
Jon Jameson – bass
Brandon Young – percussion
Matthew Vasquez – vocals
Sean Walker – guitar
Kelly Winrich – multi-instrumentalist

References

Delta Spirit albums
2008 debut albums
Rounder Records albums
Alternative country albums by American artists
Americana albums
Blues albums by American artists
Folk rock albums by American artists
Indie folk albums by American artists
Soul albums by American artists
Southern rock albums